Alizé Cornet and Virginie Razzano were the defending champions, having won the event in 2012, but both players decided not to defend their title.

Renata Voráčová and Barbora Záhlavová-Strýcová won the title, defeating Irina Falconi and Eva Hrdinová in the final, 6–4, 6–0.

Seeds

Draw

References 
 Draw

Sparta Prague Open - Doubles
WTA Prague Open
2013 in Czech tennis